Guillaume Gfeller (born April 27, 1985, in L'Annonciation, Quebec) is a Canadian former competitive ice dancer. He competes with partner Andrea Chong, with whom he teamed up in 2007. They placed 4th at the 2009 Canadian Championships.

Gfeller had previously competed with Jordan McKenzie. He holds dual Canadian and Swiss citizenship.

Programs
(with Chong)

Competitive highlights

With Chong

With McKenzie

References

 National team profile: Chong & Gfeller
 
 

Canadian male ice dancers
1985 births
Living people
Sportspeople from Quebec
People from Laurentides
20th-century Canadian people
21st-century Canadian people